"Kid Charlemagne" is a song by the rock group Steely Dan, which was released as a single from their 1976 album The Royal Scam and reached number 82 in the Billboard charts. It is a fusion of a funk rhythm and jazz harmonies with rock and roll instrumentals and lyrical style. The guitar solo by jazz fusion guitarist Larry Carlton was ranked #80 in the list of the 100 greatest guitar songs by Rolling Stone.

Lyrics
The song tells the story of the rise and fall of a drug dealer in the context of the psychedelic scene of the 1960s on the West Coast. Specifically, writers Walter Becker and Donald Fagen have stated that the lyrics were loosely inspired by the exploits of the San Francisco-based LSD chemist Owsley Stanley, augmented with numerous other images of the Sixties:

On the hill the stuff was laced with kerosene
But yours was kitchen clean
Everyone stopped to stare at your Technicolor motor home
Every A-frame had your number on the wall

The first two lines draw on the fact that Owsley's acid was famed for its purity, and the Technicolor motor home of the third line is likely a reference to the famous psychedelic bus named Furthur, which was used by the Merry Pranksters, who were supplied their LSD by Owsley.

Larry Carlton's guitar solo
Carlton's guitar solo starts at 2'18" into the song and ends at 3'08". It was described, by Pete Prown and HP Newquist, as "twisted single-note phrases, bends, and vibrant melody lines"; they called this, and the solo in the fade-out, "breathtaking." According to Rolling Stone, which ranked "Kid Charlemagne" at #80 in the list of the 100 greatest guitar songs, "In the late seventies, Steely Dan made records by using a revolving crew of great session musicians through take after take, which yielded endless jaw-dropping guitar solos. Larry Carlton's multi-sectioned, cosmic-jazz lead in this cut may be the best of all: It's so complex it's a song in its own right." Far Out Magazine, in 2022, listed it as #4 in a list of the six greatest Steely Dan guitar solos, saying the "lead lines of 'Kid Charlemagne' are intense, fluid, and frequently on the brink of spinning out of control". Nick Hornby, in Songbook, spoke of the solo's "extraordinary and dexterous exuberance", though he questioned the relationship between the solo and the "dry ironies of the song's lyrics". Prown and Newquist described the solo during the fade-out as a "joyous, off-the-cuff break".

The tap on the fretboard, at the end of the solo, was cited by Adrian Belew as an early example of what he and fellow guitarist Rob Fetters were trying to accomplish, at the time when Eddie van Halen was experimenting with the technique.

Reception
Cash Box said that "the melody and arrangement are complicated, but accessible" and "every note is necessary."

Personnel 

 Donald Fagen – lead vocals, organ
 Larry Carlton – lead guitar
 Walter Becker – rhythm guitar
 Don Grolnick – Fender Rhodes electric piano
 Paul Griffin – Hohner Clavinet
 Chuck Rainey – bass
 Bernard Purdie – drums
 Donald Fagen, Michael McDonald, Venetta Fields, Clydie King, Sherlie Matthews – background vocals

Other appearances 
 Kanye West sampled the song on "Champion", from his 2007 album Graduation. Becker and Fagen initially refused West's request to use the song. They changed their minds after receiving a personal letter from West explaining the song's importance.

References 

Steely Dan songs
1976 songs
Songs about drugs
Songs written by Donald Fagen
Songs written by Walter Becker
ABC Records singles
Song recordings produced by Gary Katz